Kal: Yesterday and Tomorrow is a 2005 Indian Hindi-language thriller drama film written and directed by Ruchi Narain. Produced by Sudhir Mishra under Sudhir Mishra Productions, the film features an ensemble cast of Chitrangda Singh, Shiney Ahuja, Smriti Mishra, Ram Kapoor, Malaika Shenoy, Sarika and Boman Irani. Shantanu Moitra composed the soundtrack and Sneha Khanwalkar composed the title track and the background score. While Prakash Kutty and Ranjeet Bahadur handled cinematography and editing respectively. The film was premiered at 7th Osian's Cinefan Festival of Asian and Arab Cinema in July 2005 won Indian Critics’ Award and released on 16 September 2005.

Plot 
Bhavna Dayal and Maya Jalan had been fellow collegians and close friends, both come from very wealthy families. Bhavna is in love with another ex-fellow collegian, Tarun Haksar, who also comes from a wealthy family, and is also in love with Bhavna. Their respective families' expect both to marry each other. However, Tarun and Maya suddenly announce their engagement, and get married, leaving a shocked and heart-broken Bhavna to deal with this situation on her own. She eventually breaks off all contact with her former lover and friend respectively. One night, several months later, a disturbed Tarun returns to her life and apartment, and stays there overnight. The next day she is shocked to find out that Maya has been shot dead, and the police suspect Tarun of killing her. The question remains if Tarun had spent the entire night with Bhavna, then who killed Maya, and further why did Tarun decide to return to Bhavna's life all of a sudden?

Cast 

 Chitrangada Singh as Bhavana Dayal
 Shiney Ahuja as Tarun Haksar
 Smriti Mishra as Maya Jalan
 Ram Kapoor as Rohan Sehgal
 Murad Ali as Teji Rathore
 Malaika Shenoy as Sangeeta Nair
 Sarika as Ira Haksar
 Boman Irani as Yashwant Dayal
 Saurabh Shukla as Rajesh Jalan
 Deepak Qazir as Lakshmi Narayan Jalan
 Vivek Madan as Anju Jalan
 Gopi Desai as Sajida Dayal
 Arbaaz Ali Khan as Sameer Dayal
 Murali Sharma as Shekhar
 Yusuf Hussein as Madan Haksar

Reception 
Taran Adarsh writing for Bollywood Hungama gave 1 out of 5 stars stating, "Ruchi has a different style of narrating a story, but cinema such as KAL - YESTERDAY & TOMORROW is not everybody's cup of tea. It gets too complicated as it unfolds!".

References

External links 

2005 films
Films scored by Shantanu Moitra
2000s Hindi-language films
Films scored by Sneha Khanwalkar
Films directed by Ruchi Narain